The School of Planning and Architecture, Vijayawada (SPA Vijayawada) is a higher education institute in Vijayawada, India, specializing education and research in the field of urban planning and architecture. It is one of the two School of Planning and Architecture (SPAs) established by the Ministry of Human Resource Development, Government of India in 2008 as an autonomous institute and a fully Centrally Funded Technical Institution (CFTI). It forms a part of the league along with the other two SPAs: SPA Bhopal and SPA Delhi.

History 
The roots of the institute are with a report made by the Institute of Town Planners, India (ITPI), on the request of the Ministry of Human Resource Development regarding the establishment of more SPAs, in addition to the SPA Delhi, established 1959. Based on this report, the decision was made to establish two schools, in Bhopal and Vijayawada. On 7 July 2008, SPA Vijayawada was established as an autonomous Centrally Funded Technical Institution (CFTI). In 2014, Lok Sabha passed a bill to make all the three SPAs "centre of excellence" on the pattern of IITs and IIMs, now it is a Institute of national importance.

Campus 
Initially, the school was operated out of a temporary campus in Acharya Nagarjuna University in Guntur till 2011, before moving to its current campus. In 2011, the foundation stone of the Vijayawada campus was laid by Daggubati Purandeswari, Minister of State for Human Resource Development. The present campus is located at Nidamanuru, on National Highway 5, close to the Vijayawada Airport (12.4 km only). Expansion plans include building more hostels to accommodate the growing number of post graduate students, a state-of-the-art sports complex and residential quarters for doctoral students.

The Government of Andhra Pradesh is in the process of allotting nearly 60 acres of land, spread over two locations in and around Vijayawada, for the development of the school. Of this, the first 7.2 acres was handed over on 22 February 2010. In January 2012, design for the new campus was adopted as part of an all-India competition and it is proposed to develop it as an eco-friendly campus with state-of-the-art facilities. The proposed campus will comprise academic, co-curricular and residential facilities.

Governance 
The school is being run under supervision and guidance of a board of governors. The board comprises members from Ministry of Human Resource Development, Department of Higher Education, Andhra Pradesh Government, two representatives of the Government of India from the fields of architecture and planning, representative of the Institute of Town Planners, Indian Institute of Architects, University Grants Commission, School of Planning and Architecture, Delhi and  All India Council for Technical Education.

Academics

Academic programmes 
The Institute conducts educational programmes leading to the degree of Bachelor of Architecture (B. Arch.), Bachelor of Planning (B. Plan.) Master of Architecture (M. Arch.), Master of Planning (M. Plan) and Doctor of Philosophy (PhD.) in the following areas:

Admission
Admissions to the under graduate programme is through the Joint Entrance Examination (JEE) conducted by the National Testing Agency, India. Foreign nationals, non-resident Indians (NRIs) and persons of Indian origin (PIOs) candidates are eligible to apply and should have qualifications from the foreign boards/universities recognized as equivalent by the Association of Indian Universities (AIU) to be shortlisted for further evaluations.

Rankings

In 2022, SPA Vijayawada was ranked 7th in architecture by the National Institutional Ranking Framework.

Student life

The present campus started with two hostels. As the intake has gradually increased, today the school has four hostels. For the first three-year students, a separate hostel has been set up that can house almost 200 — future proof for the substantial increase in intake planned. In addition to these, school has a special quarters which houses visiting students and guest faculties. Two hostels are dedicated for final-year students with over special accommodation.

Dedicated mess facilities and round-the-clock canteen facilities are available between the hostels. The common rooms at the hostels have a 20" LCD TV with satellite cable, in addition to the facilities for playing indoor games. It is the scene of action for get-togethers, parties and informal discussions.

See also
 School of Planning and Architecture
 School of Planning and Architecture, Delhi
 Ministry of Human Resource Development
 Vijayawada
 T-Square 
 Pencil

References

External links 
  SPA Vijayawada

Universities and colleges in Vijayawada
School of Planning and Architecture
Educational institutions established in 2008
2008 establishments in Andhra Pradesh